Lower Newcastle is a Local service district in New Brunswick.

History

Notable people

See also
List of communities in New Brunswick

References

Communities in Northumberland County, New Brunswick
Designated places in New Brunswick
Local service districts of Northumberland County, New Brunswick